The Caretaker is a fictional character appearing in American comic books published by Marvel Comics. There have been two incarnations of the character.

The Caretaker appeared in the 2007 film Ghost Rider and the Hulu television series Helstrom, portrayed by Sam Elliott and Robert Wisdom respectively.

Publication history
The first Caretaker debuted in Ghost Rider vol. 3 #28 and was created by Howard Mackie and Andy Kubert.

The second Caretaker debuted in Ghost Rider vol. 6 #26 and was created by Jason Aaron and Tan Eng Huat.

Fictional character biography

Caretaker (original)
Caretaker is a member of The Blood, a mystical organization dedicated to fighting evil with himself as the guardian of the family line associated with the ancient Medallion of Power. He watches over the Salem Fields Cemetery in Cypress Hills, Brooklyn, New York.

The cemetery has been the site of much magical evil, partly due to an ancient race of evil beings trapped beneath it. Caretaker has his own system of secret tunnels leading throughout the place, many that go in visual range of the bodies. Well before becoming involved in the lives of both Ghost Riders, Caretaker meets and befriends Doctor Strange.

Ghost Rider, very weak from an attack on his human host, Daniel Ketch, was being pursued by Lt. Badalino through the cemetery. Caretaker knocked out the police officer with his shovel. With the assistance of Johnny Blaze, Ghost Rider is able to escape capture. At a later time, Caretaker informs Daniel that he need not wait until innocent blood had been spilled before transforming into Ghost Rider.

Caretaker later works with Seer, a younger, 'rookie' member of his race, who sometimes fails to listen to orders. Seer is capable of boosting Caretaker's powers.

In one incident, when Lilith returns from a seeming death, the result is a mist seeping from the cemetery. Where it touches, death literally follows. A group of Midnight Sons associates gather, including Hannibal King, Victoria Montesi and the two Ghost Riders. They enter the cemetery in an attempt to save lives but are quickly overwhelmed. They rescue the reporter Linda Wei but all seems lost. Caretaker appears and saves their lives by leading them through one of his secret passages but even then they are almost overwhelmed. Later, well outside the cemetery, he declares he will take those involved with the 'Medallion of Power', Ghost Rider, Johnny Blaze and Vengeance, well away from the city. If the forces of Lilith get the Medallion as a whole, they would be unstoppable. The heroes resist leaving, even to the point of Blaze drawing his gun on Caretaker. This is enough to convince him, though he still believes the group is being foolish.

The Lilin would be the least of Caretaker's problems as a new threat would arise in the form of a traitorous angel seeking to overthrow God and claim Heaven for himself - Zadkiel. To accomplish his goal, Zadkiel had to enlist earthly subordinates to eliminate any who would threaten his mission. In a bitter act of betrayal, Zadkiel coerced Daniel Ketch to confront and destroy his former Caretaker. Ketch didn't face his mentor alone, however. He had help in the form of some of his old enemies: Blackout, Doghead and Death Ninja plus the Orb had returned from obscurity. Caretaker wasn't about to go down without a fight, but the numbers were against him. Eventually, he did go down, Blackout striking the fatal blow, but before he left this world, he met his granddaughter, Sara, and told her she was to replace him. For his loyal service on Earth, Caretaker's soul went to Heaven, but a Heaven ruled by Zadkiel meant his soul was torn to pieces and scattered to the winds on arrival. However, Zadkiel is ultimately banished to Hell, and his actions against Paradise were presumably undone by God, thus possibly indicating that Caretaker's soul was ultimately restored.

Sister Sara

Believing God sent her a disturbing vision of a grandfather she never knew, Sister Sara left her convent in Kansas to journey through unfamiliar territory to get to Tennessee to offer her help. Sara, alone and naïve, asked a trucker for a ride, but once they arrived Sister Sara had no money to pay the driver for the trip. The trucker wanted to negotiate some form of payment, but he soon found out one of the Lord's flock was not a meek little lamb. Sara knocked the trucker's head through his window and ran from the truck. As fate would have it, Johnny Blaze was on his way to Tennessee too. First he was unwilling to help, but an angry and injured truck driver convinced Johnny to give Sister Sara a lift. The two of them wound up at the seemingly insignificant shack of Sara’s grandfather, Caretaker.
Caretaker was badly wounded and dying because of an assault on his home led by Daniel Ketch – a former Ghost Rider now servant of the rogue angel, Zadkiel. Caretaker managed to defeat three of Ketch's allies, Doghead, The Orb, and Death Ninja, before the vampire known as Blackout struck the fatal blow. Ketch began to destroy the contents of Caretaker's home as Blackout confronted Blaze. Caretaker, in the meantime, told Sara she was about to enter a life that he never meant for her to have. She desperately wanted to get him to a hospital, but Caretaker knew his time on Earth was done, so he urged her to get to the tunnels under his house and save what she could before Danny destroyed it all. Distraught over losing the family she never knew she had, Sara did as she was told and found a library of books within the tunnels. One touch was all it took, and the knowledge contained within the books flooded Sara's mind. She became the new Caretaker, librarian and guardian to everything dealing with the Spirits of Vengeance.

Blaze found his half-brother, Ketch, who fled to Tibet, and Sara insisted on tagging along now that she was ready to embrace her new role in life. Blaze agreed because Sara had the answers he was looking for, and the two chased Daniel down. In Tibet, Blaze and Sara arrived too late to save a Ghost Rider named Nima from being killed at the hands of Ketch, but Blaze had the chance to confront his family only to wind up on the losing end of the battle. Blaze sank into a depression despite Sara's best efforts to snap him out of it, and even the arrival of two more Ghost Riders, Molek and Bai Gu Jing, didn't help at all. The group eventually journeyed to Japan to seek another of their kind, but all they found was a frightened man stripped of his powers by Daniel Ketch. Yoshio Kannabe, now a former Spirit of Vengeance, would be no use to them. However, Molek knew of a place in the Congo where two more Ghost Riders were waiting. Baron Skullfire and his lover, Marinette Bwa Chech, were ready to join Sara and her allies in the war against Zadkiel.

Sara and Molek had a heart-to-heart talk before the final battle, and he told her she was an amazing woman to take everything in stride even though her burden was thrust upon her so suddenly. Sara and Molek seemed to have a connection, and she stood at his side when Ketch and the Black Host arrived, but when the dust settled, Sara was one of the only survivors of the conflict. Ketch had successfully drained the other Ghost Riders of their powers, and Zadkiel had won his war with Heaven. Afterwards, Blaze and Ketch went their separate ways, leaving Sara alone. She journeyed back home to her convent in Kansas, but she walked into a horrific scene. It appeared as if all the nuns inside were brutally slaughtered by an unknown assailant. Mother Superior, head of the convent, was left barely breathing and she explained what had happened in Sara's absence. After Sara buried the bodies, she decided to avenge her fallen sisters and seek out their murderer – The Deacon.

However, she was visited by Spirits of Vengeance from the future who gave her hope by informing her the war with Zadkiel wasn't truly over. Sara sought out Johnny Blaze, and found him in battle with a demon called the Skin-Bender. At first, she didn't recognize him, claiming the Ghost Rider was free of Blaze's presence, but that was not the case. Blaze wanted no part in a rematch with Zadkiel until Sara reminded him the souls of his children reside in Heaven. Fearing what Zadkiel might do to them, Blaze rode away with Sara, ready to dish out vengeance.

They traveled all over the country to find a way to get to Zadkiel, but it wasn't until a pair of his minions told them about the Antichrist, Kid Blackheart, that Sara and Blaze knew what to look for. They tracked the Antichrist down to New York, but he was already in the company of Hellstorm and Jaine Cutter who had rescued him from certain death. Ketch also showed up with a story how he sold his soul for the keys to Heaven. The only catch was the group had to keep the Antichrist safe. Blaze and Ketch split off from the rest of the group, leaving Sara with the others, but an attack from Madcap and Scarecrow isolated Sara with the Son of Satan. The Antichrist quickly turned on Sara, and with aid from Master Pandemonium, knocked her unconscious. Bound and helpless, Sara was at the mercy of her captors, but what came next was even a surprise to her. The Antichrist showed her what she truly was – a gateway to Heaven. Her power was revealed, and as he laughed that Blaze and Ketch had the key under their noses the whole time without knowing it, the Antichrist led an army of demons into Heaven through Sara. The power within her grew to such an extent, Sara teleported to the site of another gateway guarded by the Gun Nuns. She was too late to help them as the Deacon slaughtered most of them as he did her sisters, but she was on time to avenge their deaths. Sara fought Deacon and left him paralyzed from the neck down. Despite his expecting her to slay him as he would have done her, Sara refused, instead choosing to pray to God, as she told him her late sisters had taught her to do. Sara reunited with Blaze and Ketch after they defeated Zadkiel and God condemned the renegade angel to Hell for all eternity, and the three of them rode off in search of new adventures.

Powers and abilities
Caretaker is part of the ancient race called 'the Blood'. He is seemingly immune or resistant to aging and conventional disease. He possesses a degree of superhuman strength and is a skillful fighter, mainly using his shovel. When needed, he has shown he can overpower Ghost Rider and Vengeance (a similarly powered being) at once. He can break the connection users have with the Medallion of Power: he can turn Ghost Rider back to Daniel Ketch at will.

Caretaker also rides an "ancient motorcycle", which possibly refers to its being an older 1960s-era model.

In other media

Television
The original Caretaker appears in Helstrom, portrayed by Robert Wisdom. This version is an African-American member of the Blood named Henry, who displays a more pleasant personality than his comics counterpart and is especially friendly towards Louise Hastings, the head of the Saint Teresa Center for Mental Health.

Film
A variation of the original Caretaker amalgamated with Carter Slade appears in Ghost Rider, portrayed by Sam Elliott.

Video games
 The original Caretaker appears in the Ghost Rider film tie-in game, voiced by Fred Tatasciore.
 The Sister Sara incarnation of the Caretaker appears in Marvel's Midnight Suns, voiced by Vanessa Marshall. This version is the immortal overseer of the Abbey, estranged sister of Lilith, and lover of Agatha Harkness who originally used magic to maintain her youth, but was forced to sacrifice the latter to create the Hunter's collar.

References

External links
 Caretaker I at Marvel Wiki
 Caretaker II at Marvel Wiki

Characters created by Andy Kubert
Characters created by Howard Mackie
Characters created by Jason Aaron
Marvel Comics sidekicks
Comics characters introduced in 1992
Comics characters introduced in 2008
Marvel Comics characters with superhuman strength
Ghost Rider
Mythology in Marvel Comics
Marvel Comics superheroes
Fictional characters with slowed ageing